Airspace Industry Corporation of China is a company registered in Hong Kong in 2012, with claimed business ranging from airport equipment, aviation logistics, aircraft and aero-engine manufacturing to environmental technology, import and export trade since 2001.

The company has contracted with Antonov on 20 August 2016 to obtain technologies, drawings and property rights of An-225. They were planning to work with local governments to build factories for producing An-225 in Luzhou, Sichuan Province and Guigang, Guangxi Province. The company has drawn attention for this deal.

References

External links
Official Website

Aerospace companies of China
Aircraft manufacturers of China
Aerospace companies of Hong Kong